A photo book or photobook is a book in which photographs make a significant contribution to the overall content. A photo book is related to and also often used as a coffee table book.

Early
Early photo books are characterized by their use of photographic printing as part of their reprographic technology. Photographic prints were tipped-in rather than printed directly onto the same paper stock used for letterpress printed text. Many early titles were printed in very small editions and were released as partworks to a network of well-informed and privileged readers. Few original examples of these books survive today, due to their vulnerability to light and damage caused by frequent handling.

What is arguably the first photo book, Photographs of British Algae: Cyanotype Impressions (1843–1853) was created by Anna Atkins. The book was released as a partwork to assist the scientific community in the identification of marine specimens. The non-silver cyanotype printing process worked by pressing actual specimens in contact with light-sensitive paper; hence the word "impression" in the book's title.

The Pencil of Nature (1844–46) was produced by William Henry Fox Talbot, who had invented  the Calotype photographic process in 1839. Although significant as the first negative/positive photography process, the Calotype was also envisioned as a commercial prospect for the reproduction of images in books through mass publication. Anticipating commercial success, Fox Talbot established purpose-made printing premises in Reading to carry out the reproduction of his book. The Pencil of Nature was released in six parts between 1844 and 1846, to an initially promising list of private subscribers whose numbers dwindled, causing the premature termination of his project.

Julia Margaret Cameron created the first photo book to illustrate a literary work. The 1874 edition of Tennyson's Idylls of the King contained twelve Cameron images that had been specially created, but reproduced as wood engravings. Cameron sought her own publisher, creating a new version of Idylls of the King, containing her original photographs as albumen prints, which came out in December of the same year.

Japanese

Photographers such as Shinzō Fukuhara were producing photography books in the 1920s. The postwar years brought low-priced photography books, such as the many volumes of Iwanami Shashin Bunko magazine. From the 1950s onward, most Japanese photographers of note have had photo books published.

The simplest Japanese translation of photo book is shashinshū, and the shashinshū section of a typical Japanese bookstore displays books of photographs with various levels of documentary or artistic merit. They primarily portray currently popular celebrities in a variety of settings and outfits. Many are of cheesecake models (guradoru), or porn starlets (nūdoru); others are of singers, television personalities, professional sportswomen (often wrestlers) and so forth.

One of the best selling Japanese photobooks of all time, Santa Fe (1991), a fine art nude photo book modelled by Rie Miyazawa and photographed by Kishin Shinoyama, sold 1.5 million copies in the early 1990s.

Personalized 

Storing digital images in traditional photo albums means printed copies are inserted in the pages of an album. Companies allow users to create personalized photo books. The resulting book is printed on digital color printers and case bound.

Professional printing and binding services offer easy creation of photo books with professional layouts and individual layout capabilities. Because of the integrated design and order workflow, hardcover bound books with customized pictures and text can be produced very cost-effectively.

Currently there are many photo book software companies who sell licensed solutions to photo labs and print houses so that their customers can create photo books (and other photo related paraphernalia) with ease. These software solutions are available for free download or online access or through apps.

Online

The development of digital cameras and the Internet allowed an enormous production and exchange of pictures, taken from different corners of the
globe. There are many possibilities nowadays for users to upload and share pictures (examples are Google and Facebook). However, many people and institutions also publish 'photo books' on the web, by providing the community with a huge web database freely available for everybody.

Sources

 Parr, Martin, and Gerry Badger. The Photobook: A History. London: Phaidon. Vol 2. 
Parr, Martin. The Photobook: A History. London: Phaidon Vol 1.
 Heiting, Manfred, and Roland Jaeger (ed.): Autopsie. Deutschsprachige Fotobuecher 1918 bis 1945. Band 1; Goettingen: Steidl Verlag, 2012.

References

External links

The Huge List of International Photobook Publishers at Fotografia Magazine
Asia Pacific Photobook Archive
Photobooks Industry Analysis

Books by type
Illustrated books
Photography

vi:Phóng sự ảnh